John Simon White (Vienna, March 4, 1910—Sarasota, FL, November 6, 2001), born Schwarzkopf, was an American opera director, vocal coach, and stage manager of Austrian birth. He was the managing director of the New York City Opera from 1970 to1980.

References

1910 births
2001 deaths
American opera directors
Austrian opera directors
Austrian emigrants to the United States